Below is the list of populated places in Trabzon Province, Turkey by the districts. In the following lists first place in each list is the administrative center of the district.

Trabzon 
 Trabzon
 Ağıllı, Trabzon		
 Akkaya, Trabzon		
 Akoluk, Trabzon		
 Aktoprak, Trabzon		
 Akyazı, Trabzon		
 Ayvalı, Trabzon		
 Beştaş, Trabzon		
 Bulak, Trabzon		
 Çağlayan, Trabzon		
 Çamoba, Trabzon		
 Çilekli, Trabzon		
 Çimenli, Trabzon		
 Çukurçayır, Trabzon		
 Doğançay, Trabzon		
 Dolaylı, Trabzon		
 Düzyurt, Trabzon		
 Esenyurt, Trabzon		
 Fatih, Trabzon		
 Geçit, Trabzon		
 Gölçayır, Trabzon		
 Gözalan, Trabzon		
 Gündoğdu, Trabzon		
 Gürbulak, Trabzon		
 İncesu, Trabzon		
 Karakaya, Trabzon		
 Karlık, Trabzon		
 Kavala, Trabzon		
 Kireçhane, Trabzon		
 Kozluca, Trabzon		
 Kutlugün, Trabzon		
 Pelitli, Trabzon		
 Özbirlik, Trabzon		
 Pınaraltı, Trabzon		
 Sayvan, Trabzon		
 Sevimli, Trabzon		
 Subaşı, Trabzon		
 Tosköy, Trabzon		
 Yalıncak, Trabzon		
 Yeniköy, Trabzon		
 Yeşilbük, Trabzon		
 Yeşiltepe, Trabzon		
 Yeşilvadi, Trabzon		
 Yeşilyurt, Trabzon

Akçaabat
 Akçaabat
 Acısu, Akçaabat		
 Adacık, Akçaabat		
 Ağaçlı, Akçaabat		
 Akçakale, Akçaabat		
 Akdamar, Akçaabat		
 Akçaköy, Akçaabat		
 Akören, Akçaabat		
 Akpınar, Akçaabat		
 Alsancak, Akçaabat		
 Ambarcık, Akçaabat		
 Arpacılı, Akçaabat		
 Aydınköy, Akçaabat		
 Bozdoğan, Akçaabat		
 Cevizli, Akçaabat		
 Cevizlik, Akçaabat		
 Çamlıca, Akçaabat		
 Çamlıdere, Akçaabat		
 Çınarlık, Akçaabat		
 Çiçeklidüz, Akçaabat		
 Çilekli, Akçaabat		
 Çukurca, Akçaabat		
 Darıca, Akçaabat		
 Demirci, Akçaabat		
 Demirkapı, Akçaabat		
 Demirtaş, Akçaabat		
 Derecik, Akçaabat		
 Doğanköy, Akçaabat		
 Dörtyol, Akçaabat		
 Esentepe, Akçaabat		
 Eskiköy, Akçaabat		
 Fındıklı, Akçaabat		
 Fıstıklı, Akçaabat		
 Gümüşlü, Akçaabat		
 Helvacı, Akçaabat		
 Işıklar, Akçaabat		
 Kaleönü, Akçaabat		
 Karaçayır, Akçaabat		
 Karpınar, Akçaabat		
 Kavaklı, Akçaabat		
 Kemaliye, Akçaabat		
 Kirazlık, Akçaabat		
 Koçlu, Akçaabat		
 Kuruçam, Akçaabat		
 Maden, Akçaabat		
 Mersin, Akçaabat		
 Meşeli, Akçaabat		
 Meydankaya, Akçaabat		
 Ortaalan, Akçaabat		
 Ortaköy, Akçaabat		
 Özakdamar, Akçaabat		
 Özdemirci, Akçaabat		
 Salacık, Akçaabat		
 Sarıca, Akçaabat		
 Sertkaya, Akçaabat		
 Söğütlü, Akçaabat		
 Şinik, Akçaabat		
 Tatlısu, Akçaabat		
 Tütüncüler, Akçaabat		
 Uçarsu, Akçaabat		
 Yeniköy, Akçaabat		
 Yeşiltepe, Akçaabat		
 Yeşilyurt, Akçaabat		
 Yıldızlı, Akçaabat		
 Zaferli, Akçaabat

Araklı 
 Araklı		
 Aytaş, Araklı		
 Ayvadere, Araklı		
 Bahçecik, Araklı		
 Bereketli, Araklı		
 Birlik, Araklı		
 Buzluca, Araklı		
 Çamlıktepe, Araklı		
 Çankaya, Araklı		
 Çiftepınar, Araklı		
 Çukurçayır, Araklı		
 Değirmencik, Araklı		
 Dulköy, Araklı		
 Erenler, Araklı		
 Erikli, Araklı		
 Halilli, Araklı		
 Hasköy, Araklı		
 İyisu, Araklı		
 Karatepe, Araklı		
 Karşıyaka, Araklı		
 Kayacık, Araklı		
 Kayaiçi, Araklı		
 Kaymaklı, Araklı		
 Kestanelik, Araklı		
 Köprüüstü, Araklı		
 Kükürtlü, Araklı		
 Merkezköy, Araklı		
 Ortaköy, Araklı		
 Pervane, Araklı		
 Sulakyurt, Araklı		
 Sularbaşı, Araklı		
 Taşönü, Araklı		
 Taşgeçit, Araklı		
 Taştepe, Araklı		
 Turnalı, Araklı		
 Türkeli, Araklı		
 Yalıboyu, Araklı		
 Yassıkaya, Araklı		
 Yeniköy, Araklı		
 Yeşilce, Araklı		
 Yeşilköy, Araklı		
 Yeşilyurt, Araklı		
 Yıldızlı, Araklı		
 Yiğitözü, Araklı		
 Yoncalı, Araklı		
 Yüceyurt, Araklı

Arsin 

 Arsin		
 Atayurt, Arsin		
 Başdurak, Arsin		
 Çardaklı, Arsin		
 Çiçekli, Arsin		
 Çubuklu, Arsin		
 Dilek, Arsin		
 Elmaalan, Arsin		
 Fındıklı, Arsin		
 Gölgelik, Arsin		
 Güneyce, Arsin		
 Harmanlı, Arsin		
 Işıklı, Arsin		
 İşhan, Arsin		
 Karaca, Arsin		
 Oğuz, Arsin		
 Örnek, Arsin		
 Özlü, Arsin		
 Üçpınar, Arsin		
 Yeniköy, Arsin		
 Yeşilköy, Arsin		
 Yeşilyalı, Arsin		
 Yolaç, Arsin		
 Yolüstü, Arsin

Beşikdüzü

 Beşikdüzü		
 Ağaçlı, Beşikdüzü		
 Akkese, Beşikdüzü		
 Aksaklı, Beşikdüzü		
 Anbarlı, Beşikdüzü		
 Ardıçatak, Beşikdüzü		
 Bayırköy, Beşikdüzü		
 Bozlu, Beşikdüzü		
 Çakırlı, Beşikdüzü		
 Çıtlaklı, Beşikdüzü		
 Dağlıca, Beşikdüzü		
 Denizli, Beşikdüzü		
 Dolanlı, Beşikdüzü		
 Duygulu, Beşikdüzü		
 Gürgenli, Beşikdüzü		
 Hünerli, Beşikdüzü		
 Kalegüney, Beşikdüzü		
 Korkuthan, Beşikdüzü		
 Kutluca, Beşikdüzü		
 Oğuz, Beşikdüzü		
 Resullü, Beşikdüzü		
 Sayvancık, Beşikdüzü		
 Seyitahmet, Beşikdüzü		
 Şahmelik, Beşikdüzü		
 Takazlı, Beşikdüzü		
 Yenicami, Beşikdüzü		
 Yeşilköy, Beşikdüzü		
 Zemberek, Beşikdüzü

Çarşıbaşı

 Çarşıbaşı		
 Çallı, Çarşıbaşı		
 Erenköy, Çarşıbaşı		
 Fenerköy, Çarşıbaşı		
 Gülbahçe, Çarşıbaşı		
 Kadıköy, Çarşıbaşı		
 Kaleköy, Çarşıbaşı		
 Kavaklı, Çarşıbaşı		
 Kovanlı, Çarşıbaşı		
 Küçükköy, Çarşıbaşı		
 Pınarlı, Çarşıbaşı		
 Samsun, Çarşıbaşı		
 Serpilköy, Çarşıbaşı		
 Şahinli, Çarşıbaşı		
 Taşlıtepe, Çarşıbaşı		
 Veliköy, Çarşıbaşı		
 Yavuz, Çarşıbaşı		
 Yeniköy, Çarşıbaşı

Çaykara

 Çaykara		
 Ataköy, Çaykara		
 Akdoğan, Çaykara		
 Arpaözü, Çaykara		
 Aşağıkumlu, Çaykara		
 Baltacılı, Çaykara		
 Çambaşı, Çaykara		
 Çamlıbel, Çaykara		
 Çayıroba, Çaykara		
 Demirkapı, Çaykara		
 Demirli, Çaykara		
 Derindere, Çaykara		
 Eğridere, Çaykara		
 Kabataş, Çaykara
 Karaçam, Çaykara		
 Kayran, Çaykara		
 Koldere, Çaykara		
 Köknar, Çaykara		
 Köseli, Çaykara		
 Maraşlı, Çaykara		
 Soğanlı, Çaykara		
 Şahinkaya, Çaykara		
 Şekersu, Çaykara
 Taşkıran, Çaykara		
 Taşlıgedik, Çaykara		
 Taşören, Çaykara		
 Ulucami, Çaykara
 Uzungöl, Çaykara		
 Uzuntarla, Çaykara		
 Yeşilalan, Çaykara		
 Yukarıkumlu, Çaykara		
 Yaylaönü, Çaykara

Dernekpazarı

 Dernekpazarı		
 Akköse, Dernekpazarı		
 Çalışanlar, Dernekpazarı		
 Çayırbaşı, Dernekpazarı		
 Gülen, Dernekpazarı		
 Günebakan, Dernekpazarı		
 Ormancık, Dernekpazarı		
 Taşçılar, Dernekpazarı		
 Tüfekçi, Dernekpazarı		
 Yenice, Dernekpazarı		
 Zincirlitaş, Dernekpazarı

Düzköy

 Düzköy		
 Alazlı, Düzköy		
 Aykut, Düzköy		
 Çalköy, Düzköy		
 Çayırbağı, Düzköy		
 Çiğdemli, Düzköy		
 Gökçeler, Düzköy		
 Gürgendağ, Düzköy		
 Küçüktepeköy, Düzköy		
 Taşocağı, Düzköy

Hayrat
 Hayrat		
 Balaban, Hayrat		
 Dağönü, Hayrat		
 Dereyurt, Hayrat		
 Fatih, Hayrat		
 Geçitli, Hayrat		
 Göksel, Hayrat		
 Kılavuz, Hayrat		
 Köyceğiz, Hayrat		
 Onur, Hayrat		
 Pazarönü, Hayrat		
 Pınarca, Hayrat		
 Sarmaşık, Hayrat		
 Şehitli, Hayrat		
 Şişli, Hayrat		
 Taflancık, Hayrat		
 Yarlı, Hayrat		
 Yeniköy, Hayrat		
 Yıldırımlar, Hayrat		
 Yırca, Hayrat

Köprübaşı
 Köprübaşı		
 Arpalı, Köprübaşı		
 Beşköy, Köprübaşı		
 Çifteköprü, Köprübaşı		
 Güneşli, Köprübaşı		
 Yağmurlu, Köprübaşı

Maçka
Maçka		
Akarsu, Maçka
Akmescit, Maçka		
Alaçam, Maçka		
Alataş, Maçka		
Altındere, Maçka		
Anayurt, Maçka		
Ardıçlıyayla, Maçka		
Armağan, Maçka	
Atasu, Maçka	
Bağışlı, Maçka		
Bakımlı, Maçka		
Bakırcılar, Maçka		
Barışlı, Maçka		
Başar, Maçka		
Coşandere, Maçka		
Çamlıdüz, Maçka		
Çatak, Maçka		
Çayırlar, Maçka		
Çeşmeler, Maçka		
Çıralı, Maçka		
Dikkaya, Maçka		
Erginköy, Maçka	
Esiroğlu, Maçka	
Gayretli, Maçka		
Günay, Maçka		
Gürgenağaç, Maçka		
Güzelce, Maçka		
Güzelyayla, Maçka		
Hamsiköy, Maçka		
Hızarlı, Maçka		
Kapuköy, Maçka		
Kaynarca, Maçka		
Kırantaş, Maçka		
Kiremitli, Maçka		
Kozağaç, Maçka		
Köprüyanı, Maçka		
Kuşçu, Maçka		
Mataracı, Maçka		
Ocaklı, Maçka		
Oğulağaç, Maçka		
Ormaniçi, Maçka		
Ormanüstü, Maçka		
Ortaköy, Maçka		
Örnekalan, Maçka		
Sevinç, Maçka		
Sındıran, Maçka		
Sukenarı, Maçka		
Şimşirli, Maçka		
Temelli, Maçka		
Üçgedik, Maçka		
Yaylabaşı, Maçka		
Yazılıtaş, Maçka		
Yazlık, Maçka		
Yeniköy, Maçka		
Yerlice, Maçka		
Yeşilyurt, Maçka		
Yukarıköy, Maçka		
Yüzüncüyıl, Maçka		
Zaferli, Maçka

Of
 Of		
 Ağaçbaşı, Of		
 Ağaçseven, Of		
 Aşağıkışlacık, Of		
 Ballıca, Of		
 Barış, Of		
 Başköy, Of		
 Bayırca, Of		
 Birlik, Of		
 Bölümlü, Of		
 Cumapazarı, Of		
 Çaltılı, Of		
 Çataldere, Of		
 Çatalsöğüt, Of		
 Çukurova, Of		
 Dağalan, Of		
 Darılı, Of		
 Dereköy, Of		
 Doğançay, Of		
 Dumlusu, Of		
 Erenköy, Of		
 Esenköy, Of		
 Eskipazar, Of		
 Fındıkoba, Of		
 Gökçeoba, Of		
 Gümüşören, Of		
 Güresen, Of		
 Gürpınar, Of		
 İkidere, Of		
 Karabudak, Of		
 Kavakpınar, Of		
 Kazançlı, Of		
 Keler, Of		
 Kıyıboyu, Of		
 Kıyıcık, Of		
 Kiraz, Of		
 Kireçli, Of		
 Korkut, Of		
 Korucuk, Of		
 Kumludere, Of		
 Ovacık, Of		
 Örtülü, Of		
 Pınaraltı, Of		
 Saraçlı, Of		
 Sarayköy, Of		
 Sarıbey, Of		
 Sarıkaya, Of		
 Sefaköy, Of		
 Serince, Of		
 Sıraağaç, Of		
 Sivrice, Of		
 Söğütlü, Of		
 Sugeldi, Of		
 Tavşanlı, Of		
 Tekoba, Of		
 Uğurlu, Of		
 Uluağaç, Of		
 Yanıktaş, Of		
 Yazlık, Of		
 Yemişalan, Of

Sürmene
 Sürmene		
 Çamburnu, Sürmene		
 Ormanseven, Sürmene		
 Oylum, Sürmene		
 Yeniay, Sürmene		
 Aksu, Sürmene		
 Armutlu, Sürmene		
 Aşağıovalı, Sürmene		
 Birlik, Sürmene		
 Çiftesu, Sürmene		
 Çimenli, Sürmene		
 Dirlik, Sürmene		
 Fındıcak, Sürmene		
 Gültepe, Sürmene		
 Güneyköy, Sürmene		
 Kahraman, Sürmene		
 Karacakaya, Sürmene		
 Konak, Sürmene		
 Koyuncular, Sürmene		
 Küçükdere, Sürmene		
 Muratlı, Sürmene		
 Ortaköy, Sürmene		
 Petekli, Sürmene		
 Üzümlü, Sürmene		
 Yazıoba, Sürmene		
 Yeşilköy, Sürmene		
 Yokuşbaşı, Sürmene		
 Yukarıçavuşlu, Sürmene		
 Yukarıovalı, Sürmene

Şalpazarı
 Şalpazarı		
 Ağırtaş, Şalpazarı		
 Akçiriş, Şalpazarı		
 Çamlıca, Şalpazarı		
 Çarlaklı, Şalpazarı		
 Çetrik, Şalpazarı		
 Doğancı, Şalpazarı		
 Dorukkiriş, Şalpazarı		
 Düzköy, Şalpazarı		
 Fidanbaşı, Şalpazarı		
 Geyikli, Şalpazarı		
 Gökçeköy, Şalpazarı		
 Gölkiriş, Şalpazarı		
 Güdün, Şalpazarı		
 Kabasakal, Şalpazarı		
 Karakaya, Şalpazarı		
 Kasımağzı, Şalpazarı		
 Kuzuluk, Şalpazarı		
 Pelitçik, Şalpazarı		
 Sayvançatak, Şalpazarı		
 Simenli, Şalpazarı		
 Sinlice, Şalpazarı		
 Sütpınar, Şalpazarı		
 Tepeağzı, Şalpazarı		
 Üzümözü, Şalpazarı

Tonya
 Tonya		
 Biçinlik, Tonya		
 Çamlı, Tonya		
 Çayıriçi, Tonya		
 Hoşarlı, Tonya		
 İskenderli, Tonya		
 Kalemli, Tonya		
 Kalınçam, Tonya		
 Karaağaçlı, Tonya		
 Karasu, Tonya		
 Kayacan, Tonya		
 Kozluca, Tonya		
 Kösecik, Tonya		
 Melikşah, Tonya		
 Sağrı, Tonya		
 Sayraç, Tonya		
 Yakçukur, Tonya

Vakfıkebir
Vakfıkebir 		
Açıkalan, Vakfıkebir		
Akköy, Vakfıkebir		
Aydoğdu, Vakfıkebir		
Bahadırlı, Vakfıkebir		
Ballı, Vakfıkebir		
Bozalan, Vakfıkebir		
Caferli, Vakfıkebir		
Çamlık, Vakfıkebir		
Çavuşlu, Vakfıkebir		
Deregözü, Vakfıkebir		
Düzlük, Vakfıkebir		
Esentepe, Vakfıkebir		
Fethiye, Vakfıkebir		
Fevziye, Vakfıkebir		
Güneyköy, Vakfıkebir		
Güneysu, Vakfıkebir		
Hamzalı, Vakfıkebir		
İlyaslı, Vakfıkebir		
İshaklı, Vakfıkebir		
Karatepe, Vakfıkebir		
Kıranköy, Vakfıkebir		
Kirazlık, Vakfıkebir		
Köprücek, Vakfıkebir		
Mahmutlu, Vakfıkebir		
Mısırlı, Vakfıkebir		
Ortaköy, Vakfıkebir		
Rıdvanlı, Vakfıkebir		
Sekmenli, Vakfıkebir		
Sinanlı, Vakfıkebir		
Soğuksu, Vakfıkebir		
Şenocak, Vakfıkebir		
Tarlacık, Vakfıkebir		
Yalıköy, Vakfıkebir		
Yaylacık, Vakfıkebir		
Yıldız, Vakfıkebir

Yomra
 Yomra		
 Yomra, Yomra		
 Çamlıyurt, Yomra		
 Çınarlı, Yomra		
 Demirciler, Yomra		
 Gülyurdu, Yomra		
 İkisu, Yomra		
 Kaşüstü, Yomra		
 Kayabaşı, Yomra		
 Kılıçlı, Yomra		
 Kıratlı, Yomra		
 Kömürcü, Yomra		
 Maden, Yomra		
 Ocak, Yomra		
 Oymalıtepe, Yomra		
 Özdil, Yomra		
 Pınarlı, Yomra		
 Şanlı, Yomra		
 Tandırlı, Yomra		
 Taşdelen, Yomra		
 Yenice, Yomra		
 Yokuşlu, Yomra

Recent development

According to Law act no 6360, all Turkish provinces with a population more than 750 000, were renamed as metropolitan municipality. Furthermore, the central district was renamed as Ortahisar. All districts in those provinces became second level municipalities and all villages in those districts  were renamed as a neighborhoods . Thus the villages listed above are officially neighborhoods of Trabzon.

References 

Trabzon
List